General elections were held in Kenya Colony on 12 February 1927.

Campaign
Reports before the election noted that of the eleven white seats, five were uncontested with the incumbent returned unopposed, one was likely to be uncontested and the remaining five would be contested. The Reform Party led by Hugh Cholmondeley issued an 18-point manifesto, which was approved by all the incumbent members of the Legislative Council except Hamilton Ward, who partly adhered to its programme, but reserved the right to vote independently. The manifesto included a call for an elected European majority on the Legislative Council. Reports that the mayor of Nairobi James Riddell would run against the Reform Party proved to be unfounded.

Following their boycott of the 1924 elections, the Indian population again failed to participate fully in the election, with only one candidate standing in the five-member Indian constituency. As a result, four Indian representatives were appointed to the Council after it was opened on 8 March. By-elections for the four Indian seats were scheduled for the following year, but no candidates were nominated due to the ongoing boycott over the separate voting rolls for Whites and Indians.

Results

Appointed members

References

1927 elections in Africa
1927 in Kenya
1927
Legislative Council of Kenya
1927
February 1927 events